Senduo Township (Mandarin: 森多乡) is a township in Guinan County, Hainan Tibetan Autonomous Prefecture, Qinghai, China. In 2010, Senduo Township had a total population of 14,346 people: 7,347 males and 6,999 females: 4,272 under 14 years old, 9,245 aged between 15 and 64 and 829 over 65 years old.

References 

Township-level divisions of Qinghai
Hainan Tibetan Autonomous Prefecture